William Simanski (born December 25, 1948) is an American politician who served in the Connecticut House of Representatives from the 62nd district from 2011 to 2021.

References

1948 births
Living people
Republican Party members of the Connecticut House of Representatives
21st-century American politicians